Iolaus ofere is a butterfly in the family Lycaenidae. It is found in Nigeria.

References

Butterflies described in 2008
Iolaus (butterfly)
Endemic fauna of Nigeria
Butterflies of Africa